A number of units of measurement were used in Iceland to measure length, mass, area, capacity, etc. Since 1907, the metric system has been compulsory in Iceland.

Unit system before the metric system

A number of units were used and these units were analogues to Danish.

Length

A number of units were used in Iceland to measure length.  One foot was equal to 0.31385 m and one nautical mile was equal to 1,855 m, as they were defined by their metric equivalents.  Some other units are given below:

 1 line =  feet
 1 inch =  feet
 1 ell = 2 feet
 1 fathom = 6 feet
 1 mile ( or ) = 24,000 feet
  = 20,000  = 120,000 feet

Mass

A number of units were used to measure mass.  One pound was equal to 0.5 kg as it was defined by its metric equivalent.  Some other units are given below:

 1 mark =  pound
 1  = 8 pounds
 1  = 40 pounds
 1  = 64 pounds
 1 barrel of butter = 224 pounds
 1  = 320 pounds
 1  = 320 pounds

Area

A number of units were used to measure area.  One square fathom was equal to 3.546 m2 and one square mile was equal to 56.7383 km2, as they were defined by their metric equivalents.  Some other units are given below:

 1 square inches =  square fathom
 1 square feet =  square fathom
 1 square  =  square fathom
 1  = 900 square fathom
 1  = 1,600 square fathom

Volume

A number of units were used to measure capacity. One pot was equal to 0.9661 L as it was defined by its metric equivalent.  Some other units are given below:

 1  = 18 pots
 1  = 39 pots
 1 general barrel = 120 pots
 1 barrel of ale = 136 pots
 1  = 144 pots

References

Icelandic culture
Units of measurement
Iceland